BJ's may refer to:

 BJ's Restaurant & Brewery
 BJ's Wholesale Club

See also
BJ (disambiguation)